Live @ Club U, Volume II (also referred to as Old School Go-Go Meets Old School Hip-Hop) is a live album released on July 29, 2003, by the Washington, D.C.-based go-go band Rare Essence. The album is follow-up to the 2001 album Doin' It Old School Style (also recorded live at Club U) and features guest appearances by Doug E. Fresh & the Get Fresh Crew and Anthony "Lil' Benny" Harley.

Track listing
"Camay All Over" – 5:47
"Display" – 7:26
"Do You Wanna Have Some Fun?" – 5:59
"Mickey's Solo" – 4:36
"Heap Big Fun" – 8:19
"Glass House" – 7:49
"Back Up Against the Wall" – 7:04
"Play This Only at Night" (featuring Doug E. Fresh) – 5:50
"D.E.F." (featuring Doug E. Fresh) – 5:41
"La Di da Di (2003)" (featuring Doug E. Fresh) – 6:48
"I'm Gettin' Ready" (featuring Doug E. Fresh) – 8:30

Personnel
Andre "White Boy" Johnson – electric guitar, vocals
James "Jas Funk" Thomas – guest vocals
Anthony "Lil' Benny" Harley – trumpet, guest vocals
Doug E. Fresh – guest vocals
Milton "Go-Go Mickey" Freeman – percussion, congas
Kent Wood – electronic keyboards
Roy Battle – trombone, keyboards
Mike Baker – bass guitar
Kimberly "Ms. Kim" Graham – vocals
Charles "Shorty Corleone" Garris – vocals
Michael "Lil' Mike" – drums
Quentin "Lil' Dud" Ivey – timbales, cowbell, rototoms
Michael Muse – vocals

References

External links
Live @ Club U, Volume II at Discogs

2003 live albums
Rare Essence albums